Barbara McMahon (born July 1, 1945, in Virginia, US) is a popular American writer of over 65 romance novels published by Harlequin Enterprises Ltd since 1984.

Biography
Barbara "Babs" McMahon (née Nash) born on July 1, 1945, and grew up in northern Virginia. Later her family moved to California, where she transferred to the University of California, Berkeley, from which she graduated in 1967. She worked in the computer industry for years.

Barbara is a member of Romance Writers of America, Novelists, Inc. and the NSDAR.

Bibliography

Single Novels
Come into the Sun (1984)
Bluebells on the Hill (1986)
Winter Stranger, Summer Lover (1987)
Island Paradise (1992)
One Love Forever (1992)
Love's Fantasy (1993)
Love's Unexpected Turn (1993)
Miss Prim and Proper (1993)
A Bride to Love (1993)
Living for Love (1994)
Cowboy's Bride (1995)
Shining Through (1995)
Triumph of Love (1995)
Wanted, Wife and Mother (1995)
One Stubborn Cowboy (1995)
Bride of a Thousand Days (1996)
Boss Lady and the Hired Hand (1997)
Santa Cowboy (1997)
Rent-A-Cowboy (1997)
Trial Engagement (1998)
Wanted, Perfect Wife (1998)
Daddy and Daughters (1998)
Temporary Father (1998)
Yours for Ninety Days (1999)
Banished (1999)
The Cowboy and the Virgin (1999)
The Husband Campaign (1999)
Bachelor's Baby Promise (2000)
The Substitute Wife (2001)
The Marriage Test (2001)
Starting with a Kiss (2001)
His Secretary's Secret''' (2002)The Sheikh's Proposal' (2002)
The Tycoon Prince (2003)
His Convenient Fiancee(2003)
The Boss's Convenient Proposal (2003)
She's Expecting (2003)
The Rancher's Bride (2004)
Marriage in Name Only (2004)
Her Spanish Boss (2004)
The First Day (2004)
Her Desert Family (2004)
Crazy About You (2004)
Winning Back His Wife (2005)
Snowbound Reunion (2006)
The Nanny and the Sheikh (2006)
His Inherited Wife (2006)
The Sheikh's Secret (2006)
The Last Cowboy Hero (2007)
Forbidden Brother (2007)
 I'll Take Forever (2011)

Western Weddings Series
Wyoming Wedding (1996)
Angel Bride (1996)
Bride on the Ranch (1997)

Sheik Series
Sheik Daddy (1996)
The Sheik's Solution (2000)

Identical Twins Series
Cinderella Twin (1998)
The Older Man (1998)

Beaufort Brides Series
Marrying Margot (1999)
A Mother for Mollie (2000)
Georgia's Groom (2000)

Babies on the Way Series
Their Pregnancy Bombshell (2005)
Pregnant: Father Needed (2005)

The House of Poppin Hill Series
The Girl Who Came Back (2005)
Lies That Bind (2006)
Truth Be Told (2006)

Omnibus in Collaboration
Desert Desires (2002) (with Sophie Weston)
Crazy About You / Deal for Love (2004) (with Gywnn Morgan)
Single with Kids / The First Day (2004) (with Lynnette Kent)
Plain Jane Makeover (2005) (with Penny Jordan and Miranda Lee)
Falling for the Boss (2005) (with Helen Brooks and Cathy Williams)
Royal Proposals (2006) (with Robyn Donald and Marion Lennox)
His Convenient Woman (2007) (with Diana Hamilton and Cathy Williams)

Graphic novels
A Prince Needs A Princess (2006) art by Reiko Kishida, the original story The Tycoon Prince

Non fiction
The Complete Guide to Buying Property in Italy: Buying, Restoring, Renting, Letting and Selling (2004)

External links
Barbara McMahon's Official Website
Barbara McMahon's Webpage in Harlequin Enterprises Ltd
Barbara McMahon's Webpage in Fantastic Fiction's Website

1945 births
Living people
20th-century American novelists
21st-century American novelists
American romantic fiction writers
American women novelists
Women romantic fiction writers
20th-century American women writers
21st-century American women writers